West Nusa Tenggara ( – NTB) is a province of Indonesia. It comprises the western portion of the Lesser Sunda Islands, with the exception of Bali which is its own province. Mataram, on Lombok, is the capital and largest city of the province. The 2010 census recorded the population at 4,500,212; the total rose to 4,830,118 at the 2015 census and 5,320,092 at the 2020 census; the official estimate as at mid 2022 was 5,473,671. The province's area is 20,153.15 km2.
The two largest islands by far in the province are Lombok in the west and the larger Sumbawa island in the east.

History

Pre-Islamic period 
Based on analysis of prehistoric objects found such as complex sarcophagi, decorated stoneware, machetes, and axes, West Nusa Tenggara had been inhabited by people from Southeast Asia.

The natives in this region are called the Sasak people, most of whom live on the island of Lombok, on the island of Sumbawa the indigenous people are divided into two groups, ethnic Sumbawa (Samawa) and Bima. However, with the wave of migrants from Bali, Makassar, Java, Kalimantan, Nusa Tenggara, Maluku and East Nusa Tenggara, the indigenous people now remain in the interior.

The region can was part of the Majapahit Empire during its height in the 14th century conquering all the kingdoms located on the islands of both Lombok and Sumbawa. In the book Negarakertagama by Mpu Prapanca in 1365, it was written that West Lombok was named "Lombok Mirah" and East Lombok was named "Sasak Adi", Taliwang, Dompo (Dompu), Sape, Sanghyang Fire, Bhima (Bima), Seram (Seran) and Hutan Kedali (Utan).

Islamic period 
In the early reign of the kings in West Nusa Tenggara, the influence of Hinduism was very strong, but with the collapse of the Majapahit Empire, the influence of Hinduism began to decrease with the onset of the influence of Islam in the coastal communities.

The creation of the Demak Sultanate in Central Java had a huge impact on the spread of Islam in West Nusa Tenggara. The influence of Islam in West Nusa Tenggara was generally brought by the Malays. The influence of Islam in Bima was supported by King I Maliingkaang Daeng-Mannyonriq of Makassar, who was then known as Karaeng Matoaya who played an important role in the spread of Islam in the region.

The influence of Islam in the Bima Sultanate emerged during the reign of King Manuru Salehi around 1605 and began to grow rapidly during the reign of King Abdul Kahir. King Abdul Kahir is also known as the Sultan of Bima because he was the king who first embraced Islam in Bima, beginning a new era, separate from the previous Bima kings who embraced Hinduism. Islam became the official religion of the kings in West Nusa Tenggara.

Colonial period 

The Europeans who first came to Nusa Tenggara were the Portuguese who landed on the island of Solor and Timor in 1605. At the same time the Dutch also came to the island of Hitu and Ambon, in the Malukus. The first Dutch ship that entered the area was the Ter Ver which docked in Kupang in 1611. The arrival of the Dutch-led to a long dispute between the Portuguese and the Dutch in Nusa Tenggara. The Dutch provided assistance to the local kings who resisted the Portuguese. The Netherlands then expanded its influence in Nusa Tenggara, to make a variety of agreements with small kings around the island of Sumbawa.

The arrival of the Dutch colonial administration greatly impacted Indonesian society, with the decline of the Sultanate of Gowa in the 17th century. Gowa nobility who did not submit to the colonial government fled from Makassar and built pockets of resistance in West Nusa Tenggara. To combat the resistance, the colonial government began to concentrate power in West Nusa Tenggara. This was reinforced by the emergence of Lombok for international trade, so the desire of the Dutch to rule West Nusa Tenggara become stronger.

The Dutch colonial government sent Stephen van Hegen for a close look at the Bima Sultanate in 1660. The arrival of the Dutch, influenced the political and economic situation in the area. In 1669, the Government of the Bima Sultanate led by Sultan Ambela Abdul Khair Sirajuddin, made peace and friendship ties with the colonial government with the agreement that:
 The Sultanate of Bima and Dompu will not attack Makassar
 To keep the peace, only members of the Dutch East India Company may visit the Bima area
 Bima and Makassar will not make any contact at all.
 Foreign traders from Europe, India, Java, Malaya, Arab lands, Aceh, and Champa must not engage in trade with Bima, except by special permit from the Dutch East India Company.

The agreement with the Sultan of Bima and Dompu recognized the existence of the Dutch colonial power. The Netherlands sought to consolidate its control by blocking the Bima port to prevent the arrival of aid from Makassar or other foreign countries. The effort was done so that the existing ports in Bima and Lombok would not fall into British hands.

Because of Dutch supremacy in the region the king and the people in the region could not move freely. This situation became worse with the eruption of Mount Tambora on April 5, 1815, which shook the entire region, and the consequences could be felt throughout the Moluccas, Java, Sulawesi, Sumatra, and Kalimantan. Mount Tambora's eruption resulted in the disappearance of the two kingdoms of Tambora and Papekat. More than 10,000 people were killed.

Independence 
West Nusa Tenggara province previously had been part of the State of East Indonesia with the creation of the United States of Indonesia, and had been part of the province of the Lesser Sunda Islands (Nusa Tenggara) after the recognition of Indonesian sovereignty.

The province of West Nusa Tenggara was created with the enactment of Law No. 64 of 1958 Dated August 14, 1958, on the Establishment of the new provinces of Bali, West Nusa Tenggara and East Nusa Tenggara, with its first governor, AR. Moh. Ruslan Djakraningrat.

Geography

Terrain 
West Nusa Tenggara has two kinds of landscape. The first is the island of Lombok with the coastline fairly straight, with the central to eastern part in the form of mountains, and coastal lowlands in the east. The second is Sumbawa Island with a jagged coastline because of the many headlands and bays, and the central part is covered with hills and limestone mountains.

Selong (capital of East Lombok Regency) is a city that has the highest altitude, which is 148 m above sea level, while the lowest Raba at 13 m above sea level. Of the seven mountains on the island of Lombok, Mount Rinjani is the highest mountain with an altitude of 3,775 m, while Mount Tambora on Sumbawa is the highest mountain with an altitude of 2,851 m.

Climate 
Like the rest of Indonesia, NTB has a tropical climate. Based on statistics from the meteorological institute, the maximum temperature in 2001 ranged from 30.9 to 32.1 °C, and the minimum temperature ranged between 20.6 and 24.5 °C. The highest temperatures occur in September and the lowest is in November. Being tropical, NTB has a high average relative humidity, which is between 48 and 95%.

West Nusa Tenggara has relatively little rainfall compared to the western region of Indonesia. Maximum rainfall in the province occurs in January and minimum rainfall occurs in August.

Economy 

The area of West Nusa Tenggara (NTB) has very beautiful natural scenery, be it the mountains or the beach. This has caused many tourists from other parts of Indonesia and other countries to flock to the province due to its stunning scenery.

In addition to the panorama of beautiful tourist attractions, food crops, and horticulture developed and cultivated by the community that is profitable for farmers, among others, are soybeans, peanuts, corn, green beans, peppers, onions, mangoes, bananas, and pineapples. In addition to the nine kinds of commodities in the regions, other horticultural commodities that can be developed are potatoes, carrots, apples, and grapes.

As for fisheries, NTB has 3 areas of fisheries development:
 The island of Lombok, with a priority on the development of marine aquaculture and freshwater fisheries, brackish water aquaculture (ponds), catching public waters;
 The western part of Sumbawa Island, priority on the development of brackishwater aquaculture (ponds), mariculture, arrest, public waters, and freshwater aquaculture;
 Eastern part of Sumbawa Island with priority on the development of catching, mariculture, public waters, and freshwater aquaculture.

West Nusa Tenggara is one of the major manufacturers and suppliers of livestock and seeds to the needs of various regions in Indonesia. The carrying capacity of livestock-based agribusiness development, among others, the potential availability of cattle in quality and quantity, land resources, and fodder, support all production, pet patterns as a group, are non-communicable diseases as well as the bank still has domestic and export markets. The NTB cow is a kind of Bali cattle, which is a leading NTB commodity and has domestic and export markets. In addition to cows and buffaloes, other supporting commodities are pigs, goats and horses, chickens, and ducks.

Administrative divisions 

The province is administratively divided into eight regencies (kabupaten) and two municipalities (kotamadya). When created, the province consisted of just six regencies; the city of Mataram was separated from West Lombok Regency on 26 July 1993, and the city of Bima was separated from Bima Regency on 10 April 2002. Two additional regencies were created - West Sumbawa from part of Sumbawa Regency on 18 December 2003, and North Lombok from part of West Lombok Regency on 24 June 2008. The regencies and cities are listed below with their administrative capitals, their areas and their populations at the 2010 census and the 2020 census, together with the official estimates as at mid 2022.

The Indonesian government has since 2013 been considering the division of Nusa Tenggara Barat Province to create a separate Sumbawa Island province. There is no information as to whether the remaining part of the present province (i.e. the districts comprising Lombok Island) would then be renamed.

Population 

Lombok is mainly inhabited by the Sasak ethnic group, with a minority Balinese population, and Sumbawa is inhabited by Sumbawa and Bimanese ethnic groups. Each of these groups has a local language associated with it as well. The population of the province was 4.5 million at the 2010 census, 5.32 million at the 2020 census and 5.47 million according to the official estimates for mid 2022. A total of 70.666% of the province's population lives on Lombok (at mid 2021), which has only 23.5% of the area.
The province is considered to be one of the least developed of Indonesia's 34 provinces. In 2005, Nusa Tenggara Barat was reported as the most affected area for malnutrition and kwashiorkor. Life expectancy in Nusa Tenggara Barat amounting to only 54 years is the lowest in Indonesia (69 years) and infant mortality rate is the highest.

Religion

References

External links 

 
 Rinjani National Park

 
Provinces of Indonesia
1958 establishments in Indonesia
Lesser Sunda Islands
States and territories established in 1958